Chaloupkaea is a genus of flowering plants belonging to the family Crassulaceae.

Its native range is Turkey to Northern Iraq.

Species:

Chaloupkaea aizoon 
Chaloupkaea bonorum-hominum 
Chaloupkaea chrysantha 
Chaloupkaea gigantea 
Chaloupkaea muratdaghensis 
Chaloupkaea pisidica 
Chaloupkaea rechingeri 
Chaloupkaea serpentinica

References

Crassulaceae
Crassulaceae genera